Lok is a village in the Titel municipality of South Bačka District in Vojvodina, Serbia. It has a population of over 1,114 people. The village has a Serb ethnic majority as of the 2011 population census.

Geography
Due to its alluvial plain, the Danube river has formed sandbars and islands over time that have relative heights of five to six meters. They now dominate the lower and wetter areas of the terrain.

Notable people
 Đorđe Vujkov, footballer
 Avram Miletic, teacher and poet

See also
 List of cities, towns and villages in Vojvodina

References

Places in Bačka